Sy is a given name, nickname/hypocorism (often of Seymour) and surname which may refer to:

Surname

In arts and entertainment
 Brigitte Sy (born 1956), French actress and filmmaker
 Latyr Sy (born 1972), Senegalese singer and percussionist
 Omar Sy (born 1978), French actor and comedian
 Oumou Sy (born 1952), Senegalese fashion designer

In sports
 Amara Sy (born 1981), Malian-French basketball player
 Baba Sy (1935–1978), Senegalese draughts player, first world champion from Africa
 Cheikha Sy (born 1990), Senegalese footballer
 Founéké Sy (born 1986), Malian footballer
 Moussa Sy, Guinean football player
 Pape Sy (born 1988), French-Senegalese basketball player
 Bandja Sy (born 1990), Malian-French basketball player

In politics
 Chan Sy (1932–1984), Cambodian politician, Prime Minister of the People's Republic of Kampuchea from 1981 to 1984
 Ousmane Sy (born 1949), Malian politician
 Seydina Oumar Sy (born 1937), Senegalese politician, Foreign Minister of Senegal from 1990 to 1991

In other fields
 Frédéric Sy, 19th and 20th century French astronomer
 Henry Sy (1924–2019), Chinese-Filipino billionaire, business magnate, investor and philanthropist
 Malick Sy (1855–1922), Senegalese Muslim religious leader and teacher
 Polly Sy, Filipino mathematician

Given name or nickname

In arts and entertainment
 Sy Barry (born 1928), American comic-book and comic-strip artist best known for his work on the strip The Phantom
 Sy Gomberg (1918–2001), American film screenwriter and producer
 Sy Montgomery (born 1958), German-American naturalist, author and scriptwriter 
 Sy Oliver (1910–1988), American jazz arranger, trumpeter, composer, singer and bandleader
 Sy Richardson (born 1941), American actor
 Sy Smith (born 1978), American R&B/soul singer
 Sy Wexler (1916–2005), American documentary filmmaker

In business
 Sy Berger (1923–2014), Topps company employee considered the father of the modern baseball card
 Sy Syms (1926–2009), American businessman, entrepreneur and philanthropist
 Seymour G. Sternberg (born 1943), chairman and former CEO of New York Life Insurance Company

In sports
 Sylvester Blye (born 1938), American basketball player
 Seymour Cromwell (1934–1977), American rower
 Sy Sanborn (1866–1934), American sportswriter
 Sy Sutcliffe (1862–1893), American baseball player

In other fields
 Sy Friedman (born 1953), American-Austrian mathematician and professor
 Seymour Hersh (born 1937), American investigative journalist and political writer
 Seymour Liebergot (born 1936), retired NASA flight controller
 Sy Montgomery (born 1958), German-American naturalist, author and scriptwriter

In fiction
 Sy Snootles, a Star Wars character
 Sy Bisti, a fictional language in the Star Wars universe
 Sy Ableman, a character from A Serious Man
 Sy Rubinek, a character from Sneaky Pete
 Seymour "Sy" Parrish, a character from One Hour Photo

See also
 Shī (surname) (施)
 Shǐ (surname) (史)
 Psy, a South Korean rapper

Lists of people by nickname
Hypocorisms
Surnames of Mauritanian origin
Surnames of Senegalese origin
Surnames of Malian origin